The 1964–65 daytime network television schedule for the three major English-language commercial broadcast networks in the United States covers the weekday daytime hours from September 1964 to August 1965.

Talk shows are highlighted in yellow, local programming is white, reruns of prime-time programming are orange, game shows are pink, soap operas are chartreuse, news programs are gold and all others are light blue. New series are highlighted in bold.

Monday-Friday

Saturday

Sunday

By network

ABC

Returning series:
The ABC Evening News with Ron Cochran
The Bugs Bunny Show 
Beany and Cecil 
The New Casper Cartoon Show
Day in Court
Discovery
Father Knows Best 
General Hospital
Get the Message
Hello, Peapickers starring Tennessee Ernie Ford
Issues and Answers
The Magic Land of Allakazam
Missing Links
News with the Women's Touch
The New Casper Cartoon Show 
The New American Bandstand 1965
Trailmaster 

New series:
A Flame in the Wind/A Time for Us
Annie Oakley 
Buffalo Bill, Jr. 
The Bullwinkle Show  
The Donna Reed Show 
Hoppity Hooper
Peter Jennings with the News
The Porky Pig Show
The Rebus Game
Shenanigans
The Young Marrieds

Not returning from 1963-64:
The Jetsons  
My Friend Flicka  
The Object Is
Queen for a Day
Seven Keys
Who Do You Trust?

CBS

NBC

See also
1964-65 United States network television schedule (prime-time)
1964-65 United States network television schedule (late night)

Sources
Castleman & Podrazik, The TV Schedule Book, McGraw-Hill Paperbacks, 1984
TV schedule pages, The New York Times, September 1964-September 1965 (microfilm)

United States weekday network television schedules
1964 in American television
1965 in American television